Jean-Yves Veillard (19 February 1939 – 25 March 2020) was a French historian.

Biography
Veillard, alongside Donatien Laurent and Alan Stivell was one of the Bleimor Scouts. A historian and researcher, Veillard was the author of a thesis on Rennes during the 19th century. He was one of the founding members of the Breton Democratic Union in 1964. He was Curator of the Musée de Bretagne rom 1967 to 2000 and opened the exhibition on Seiz Breur.

Jean-Yves Veillard died on 25 March 2020 at the age of 81.

Works
Celtes et Armorique (1971)
Catalogue des intailles et camées de la collection du président de Robien (1972)
Rennes au xixe siècle : architectes, urbanisme et architecture (1978)
Études sur la presse en Bretagne aux xixe et xxe siècles (1981)
Rennes naguère : 1850–1939 (1981)
L’Ecomusée du pays de Rennes (1991)
Promenades à Rennes. Le xixe siècle (1991)
L’affaire Dreyfus et l’opinion publique en France et à l’étranger (1995)
Dictionnaire du patrimoine breton (2000)
Ar Seiz Breur 1923–1947, la création bretonne entre tradition et modernité (2000)
Monsieur le "conservateur". Musées et combats culturels en Bretagne au temps de Yann-Cheun Veillard (2001)
Dictionnaire du patrimoine rennais (2004)
Ar Seiz Breur 1923–1947, la création bretonne entre tradition et modernité (2007)

References

1939 births
2020 deaths
20th-century French historians
21st-century French historians
21st-century French male writers
20th-century French male writers
Writers from Rennes